The Victorian Heritage Inventory, commonly known as the Heritage Inventory, is a list of all known historical archaeology sites in Victoria, Australia.  It is maintained by Heritage Victoria

, the Victorian State Government’s principal cultural (non-Indigenous) heritage agency.

The Heritage Inventory, which lists over 5000 sites, can be searched online through the Victorian Heritage Database.
 The inventory is also available in JSON format through an authentication-free RESTful API.

As of June 2022 the database contains information from 33 Heritage Authorities. This includes:

 City of Ballarat
 City of Banyule
 City of Boroondara
 City of Brimbank
 Shire of Cardinia
 City of Casey
 City of Darebin
 City of Glen Eira
 Shire of Glenelg
 Golden Plains Shire
 City of Greater Bendigo
 City of Greater Geelong
 Shire of Hindmarsh
 City of Hobsons Bay
 City of Manningham
 City of Maribyrnong
 City of Maroondah
 City of Melton
 City of Moonee Valley
 Shire of Moorabool
 City of Moreland
 National Trust of Australia
 Shire of Nillumbik
 Shire of Northern Grampians
 Borough of Queenscliffe
 South Gippsland Shire
 Shire of Southern Grampians
 City of Stonnington
 Victorian War Heritage Inventory
 Victorian Heritage Inventory
 Victorian Heritage Register
 City of Yarra
 Yarra Ranges Shire

References

Heritage registers in Australia
History of Victoria (Australia)